The 2007 Southeast Asian Games (SEA) basketball tournaments was held at Keelapirom Stadium, Suranaree University of Technology at Nakhon Ratchasima, Thailand.

The basketball events were not held on the 2005 Southeast Asian Games since the host country, the Philippines basketball federation (the Basketball Association of the Philippines) was suspended by the International Basketball Federation (FIBA). The suspension was lifted in 2006 and the Philippines and Malaysia defended their men's and women's championships, respectively, last won in 2003.

The tournament was conducted on a single round robin; the team with best record wins the gold.

The men's team of the Philippines maintained their superiority in the SEA Games, winning all of their games with an average lead of 42 points; the women's team of Malaysia easily dispatched their opponents in the first two games before upending the Thais in overtime to successfully defend their gold.

Men's tournament

Participating nations

Results

Times given below are in Time in Thailand (UTC+7).

Women's tournament

Participating nations
 
 
 
 
  – withdrew

Results

Times given below are in Time in Thailand (UTC+7).

This game was supposedly to be held on December 9 but host Thailand switched the game schedule placing the Philippines-Thailand game on December 9.

This game was supposedly to be held on December 8 but host Thailand switched the game schedule placing the Philippines-Singapore game on December 8.

Medal summary

Medal tally

Medalists

See also
 Basketball at the Southeast Asian Games
 Southeast Asian Championships 2007

References

External links
 Basketball at the official website of the 2007 SEA Games

basketball
2007
International basketball competitions hosted by Thailand
2007–08 in Asian basketball
2007–08 in Philippine basketball
2007–08 in Malaysian basketball
2007–08 in Indonesian basketball
2007–08 in Singaporean basketball
2007–08 in Thai basketball
2007 in Cambodian sport